The following is a list of people from Milan.

Scientists

Mathematics 
Eugenio Calabi (born 1923)
Marco Abate (born 1962)
Maria Gaetana Agnesi (17181799), the world's first woman to write a mathematics handbook and the first woman appointed as a mathematics professor at a university, wrote the first book discussing both differential and integral calculus
Enzo Tonti (19352021)

Fencing theorists 
Camillo Agrippa (15351595), is considered to be one of the greatest fencing theorists of all time

Fine arts

Architects 
Donato Felice d'Allio (16771761), Rococo style, worked in Austria

Sculptors 
Carlo Abate (18591941)

Painters 
Filippo Abbiati (16401715)
Mario Acerbi (painter) (18871982)
Angelo Achini (18501930)
Franz Adam (18151886)
Luigi Ademollo (17641849)
Carlo Paolo Agazzi (18701922)
Federico Agnelli (16261702), engraver
Claudio Detto (born 1950), Italian contemporary art painter
Giorgio Salmoiraghi (born 1936)

Photographers 
Gabriele Basilico (19442013)
Fabio Ponzio (born 1959)
Oliviero Toscani (born 1942)

Writers and historians 
Ottavio Codogno (1570/74–1630), author of a guidebook to the postal services of early 17th-century Europe

Musicians

Arrangers 

Pino Presti (born 1943) Italian bassist, arranger, composer, conductor and record producer

Pianists 

Marcello Abbado (19262020)
Maria Teresa Agnesi Pinottini (17201795), harpsichordist

Singers 
Iris Adami Corradetti (19041998)

Orchestral conductors 

Claudio Abbado (19332014)
Roberto Abbado (born 1954)
Riccardo Chailly

Pop rock artists 
Manuel Agnelli (born 1966), alternative rock, member of the band Afterhours
Ghigo Agosti (born 1936), also comedy rock
Adriano Celentano (born 1938) 
Cristina Scabbia (born 1972), singer of Lacuna Coil

Politicians 
Agnese Visconti (13631391), consort of Francesco I Gonzaga Lord of Mantua
Vittorio Agnoletto (born 1958), (Communist Refoundation Party), member of the European Parliament
Silvio Berlusconi (born 1936), Italian politician who served as Prime Minister of Italy in four governments
Bettino Craxi (19342000), Italian politician, leader of the Italian Socialist Party from 1976 to 1993 and Prime Minister of Italy from 1983 to 1987
Mario Monti (born 1943), Italian economist who served as the Prime Minister of Italy from 2011 to 2013

Catholic religious 
Alberto Ablondi (19242010)
Ferdinando d'Adda (16501719), cardinal of San Clemente, San Pietro in Vincoli, Santa Balbina and Albano, archbishop of Amasya and apostolic nuncio to Great Britain
Aicone (died 918), archbishop of Milan

Media

Actors/Actresses of Film, Theatre and TV 
Diego Abatantuono (born 1955)
Cele Abba (19061992)
Marta Abba (19001988)
Marco Lui (1975), mime and comedian

TV and radio presenter 
Lucilla Agosti (born 1978), TV and radio presenter and actress

Athletes

Footballers 
Camillo Achilli (1921–1998), football player and coach
Marco Achilli (1948–2009), football player, one-time Italian Serie A champion
Ermanno Aebi (1892–1976), football player and referee, two-time Italian Serie A champion
Aurelio Biassoni (1912–?), football player
Mario Ciminaghi (1910–?), football player
Luciano Gariboldi (1927–1988), football player
Alessio Locatelli (born 1978), football player
Leonida Lucchetta (1911–?), football player
Roberto Manini (born 1942), football player
Rodolfo Negri (1913–?), football player
Giuseppe Mettica (1919–2003), football player
Roberto Poluzzi (born 1936), retired professional football player
Aldo Riva (1923–?), football player

Ice hockey 
Giancarlo Agazzi (19321995), ice hockey player, coach and president, six-time Italian Serie A champion and two-time Spengler Cup champion

Olympic sports 
Carlo Agostoni (19091972), épée, one-time Olympic champion and one-time world champion
Alessandro Aimar (born 1967), sprint

A–B

Claudio Abbado
Maria Gaetana Agnesi
Luigi Albertini
Alboinus
Michele Alboreto
Joseph Allegranza
Saint Ambrose
Giorgio Ambrosoli
Enrico Annoni
Anspert
Michelangelo Antonioni
Aribert (Ariberto da Intimiano)
Giorgio Armani
 (died 974)
Arnulf II, Archbishop of Milan (died 1018)
Arnulf III, Archbishop of Milan (died 1097)
Alberto Ascari
Augustine of Hippo (Saint Augustine)
Franco Baresi
Giuseppe Baresi
Eugène de Beauharnais (17811824), Viceroy of Italy during the Napoleonic Kingdom of Italy, whose capital was Milan
Cesare Beccaria
Bellovesus
Luca Beltrami
Giovanni Berchet
Teresa Berganza
Giuseppe Bergomi
Silvio Berlusconi

Enzo Biagi
Luciano Bianciardi

Leonardo di Bisuccio
Giorgio Bocca
Umberto Boccioni
Ferdinando Bocconi

Arrigo Boito
Enrico Bombieri
Valentino Bompiani
Mike Bongiorno

Saint Charles Borromeo (San Carlo Borromeo)
Federico Borromeo, Cardinal Archbishop of Milan

Ruggero Giuseppe Boscovich

Alfredo Bracchi
Donato Bramante (Donato di Pascuccio di Antonio)
Bramantino (Bartolomeo Suardi)
Massimo Brambati
Gino Bramieri
Tinto Brass
Ernesto Breda
Gianni Brera
Francesco Brioschi

C–E

Maria Callas, opera singer
 (1867–1936), businessman; born in Milan
Antonio Canova, sculptor
Cesare Cantù
Ivan Capelli, Formula One driver
Gianni Caproni
Caravaggio (Michelangelo Merisi), painter
Girolamo Cardano
Carlo Carrà, painter
Panfilo Castaldi
Nino Castelnuovo, actor; born in Lecco; moved to Milan
Carlo Cattaneo
Felice Cavallotti
Adriano Celentano, musician
Franco Cerri, musician
Giorgio de Chirico, painter
Giuseppe Ciribini (19131990), engineer
 (19302003), Marxist historian specializing in Asia
Giuseppe Colombo
Attilio Colonello (1930–2021), scenic designer and stage director for opera
Federico Confalonieri, businessman
Bernardino Corio (14591519?), historian, author of the Storia di Milano
Cesare Correnti
Valentina Cortese
Bettino Craxi, politician
Enrico Cuccia, banker
Vincenzo Cuoco
Dadamaino, painter
Emilio Dandolo
Enrico Dandolo
Giovanni D'Anzi, musician
Beatrice d'Este
 (18491907), businessman and senator; he founded the Società Ernesto De Angeli e C, a textile company manufacturing cotton prints
Emilio De Marchi
Filippo De Pisis, painter
Victor de Sabata
Renzo De Vecchi
Ivan Della Mea
Ardito Desio, climber
Diocletianus
Domenico Dolce, fashion designer
Carlo Dossi
, businessman and pharmacist who founded Carlo Erba SpA; his distribution of the imported laxative Magnesia Henry was "a huge commercial success"
, artist

F–L

Giacinto Facchetti, footballer
Giangiacomo Feltrinelli ,book publisher
Filarete (Antonio di Pietro Averlino)
Francesco Filelfo*Eugenio Finardi, musician
Dario Fo, actor, playwright
Lucio Fontana, sculptor
Vincenzo Foppa
Enrico Forlanini
Franko B, sculptor, performance artist
Paolo Frisi
Renato Fumagalli
Giorgio Gaber, musician, actor
Saint Galdinus (Galdino della Sala)
Carlo Emilio Gadda
Ignazio Gardella
Brunella Gasperini, writer, journalist
Agostino Gemelli
Saint Gervasius
Ludovico Geymonat, philosopher
Riccardo Giacconi
Melchiorre Gioia
Luigi Giussani
Alberto da Giussano
Paolo Grassi, theatre empresario
Julien Green
Tommaso Grossi
Francesco Hayez, painter
Ferdinando Innocenti
Enzo Jannacci, musician, actor
Anna Kuliscioff
Ugo La Malfa, politician
Landolfo da Carcano
Licinius, Roman emperor who co-authored the Edict of Milan
Marco Lui, mime and comedian

M–Q

Clara Maffei
Carlo Maria Maggi
Giovanni Malagodi
Paolo Maldini, footballer
Mariuccia Mandelli
Alessandro Manzoni, writer, poet
Filippo Tommaso Marinetti, writer, poet
Carlo Maria Martini, archbishop
Pietro Mascagni
Enrico Mattei*Valentino Mazzola, footballer
Samuel Charles Mazzuchelli
Giuseppe Meazza
Mariangela Melato, actress
Francesco Melzi d'Eril
Teresa Meroni, trade unionist, and socialist
Cesare Merzagora
Mario Merz, sculptor
Madusa, monster truck driver, professional wrestler
Mina, singer
Arnoldo Mondadori, book publisher
Eugenio Montale, poet, journalist
Indro Montanelli, journalist, newspaper editor
Mario Monti, economist, politician
Vincenzo Monti
Giovan Battista Montini (Pope Paul VI)
Angelo Moratti
Letizia Moratti, politician
Massimo Moratti
Angelo Motta
Bruno Munari, artist, designer
Riccardo Muti
Giovanni Muzio
Giulio Natta
Egidio Notaristefano
Emma Palladino
Giuseppe Parini, poet
Ferruccio Parri
Laura Pausini, musician
Silvio Pellico, poet
Francesco Petrarca
Giuseppe Piermarini
Gino Pollini
Maurizio Pollini, pianist
Arnaldo Pomodoro, sculptor
Gio Pomodoro, sculptor
Gio Ponti, architect
Carlo Porta
Miuccia Prada, fashion designer
Pino Presti
Giuseppe Prina
Saint Protasius
Salvatore Quasimodo, poet

R–S

Alberto Rabagliati
Bonvesin da la Riva
Gianni Rivera
Angelo Rizzoli
Michele Rocca (footballer)
Aldo Rossi
Medardo Rosso
Giuseppe Rovani
Gabriele Salvatores
Alberto Savinio
Cristina Scabbia
Giovanni Schiaparelli
Tino Scotti
Giovanni Segantini
Beppe Severgnini
Francesco I Sforza
Francesco II Sforza
Ludovico Sforza (Ludovico il Moro)
Massimiliano Sforza
Cicco Simonetta
Mario Sironi
Edoardo Sonzogno
Ettore Sottsass
Saul Steinberg
Stendhal
Antonio Stoppani
Giorgio Strehler
Ildefonso Schuster

T–Z

Renata Tebaldi
Carlo Tenca
Giuseppe Terragni
Delio Tessa
Enzo Tonti
Arturo Toscanini
Gian Giacomo Trivulzio
Filippo Turati
Una Chi
Franca Valeri
Leo Valiani
Giuseppe Verdi
Luigi Veronesi
Umberto Veronesi
Alessandro Verri
Pietro Verri
Bernabò Visconti
Filippo Maria Visconti
Gian Galeazzo Visconti
Luchino Visconti
Matteo Visconti
Ottone Visconti
Elio Vittorini
Alessandro Volta
Adolfo Wildt
Marco Zanuso
Bernardino Zenale
Walter Zenga

See also

 List of Italian people
 List of Governors of the Duchy of Milan
 List of mayors of Milan
 List of Milanese consorts
 List of Milanese painters
 List of rulers of Milan

References

Milan
People